Misdeal (French: Maldone) is a 1928 French silent drama film directed by Jean Grémillon and starring Charles Dullin, Marcelle Dullin and Geymond Vital. The film's sets were designed by art director André Barsacq. The film tells the story of a wealthy young man flees from his family's estate, and finds employment as a canal worker. He falls in love with a gypsy girl, but when a death in the family requires him to return home and run his estate, he marries a neighbor's daughter. Years later, he becomes obsessed with his old lover after a chance meeting.

Cast
 Charles Dullin as Olivier Maldone  
 Marcelle Dullin as Missia, la voyante 
 Geymond Vital as Marcellin Maldone 
 André Bacqué as Juste Maldone, l'oncle 
 George Seroff as Léonard, le serviteur 
 Annabella as Flora Lévigné 
 Roger Karl as Lévigné père 
 Mathilde Alberti as L'épicière 
 Lucien Arnaud as Le voyageur 
 Genica Athanasiou as Zita 
 Edmond Beauchamp as Le gitan 
 Alexej Bondireff as Le patron de la péniche 
 Gabrielle Fontan
 Isabelle Kloucowski as La gitane 
 Charles Lavialle as Le facteur 
 Daniel Lecourtois as Un danseur 
 Jean Mamy as Un marinier

References

Bibliography
 Levine, Alison. Framing the Nation: Documentary Film in Interwar France. A&C Black, 2011.

External links 
 

1928 films
French drama films
French silent feature films
1928 drama films
1920s French-language films
Films directed by Jean Grémillon
Films set in France
French black-and-white films
Silent drama films
1920s French films